Harrisonville was a small town, now extinct, in Tippecanoe Township, Tippecanoe County, in the U.S. state of Indiana.

The community is now part of the town of Battle Ground.

History

Harrisonville was founded in 1834 by John Burget. A post office was established at Harrisonville in 1835, but was discontinued in that same year.

Geography

References

Former populated places in Tippecanoe County, Indiana
Former populated places in Indiana